The Federation of Pentecostal Churches (abbreviated BFP) is a Pentecostal Christian denomination in Germany. With 56,275 members in 2019, it is the largest association of affiliated Pentecostal Denominations in Germany and is the German branch of the Assemblies of God.

History
Pentecostalism first came to Germany in 1906–1908, but the BFP was founded in 1954 as the Association of Christian Churches in Germany (Arbeitsgemeinschaft der Christengemeinden in Deutschland, ACD). It changed to its current name in 1982. There is a seminary of the German Federation of Pentecostal Churches in the town of Erzhausen: Bible School Beröa also called Theologisches Seminar Beröa.

References

External links

Protestantism in Germany
germany
Pentecostalism in Europe